Reto Delnon (May 1, 1924 – November 6, 1983) was a Swiss professional ice hockey player who competed for the Swiss national team at the 1952 Winter Olympics. In 1962, he was sacked from the role as coach of the Swiss national team due to his membership in the Communist Party of Labour.

References

External links
Reto Delnon's profile at Sports-Reference.com

1924 births
1983 deaths
HC La Chaux-de-Fonds players
Ice hockey players at the 1952 Winter Olympics
Olympic ice hockey players of Switzerland
Swiss communists
Swiss ice hockey coaches
Swiss ice hockey centres